Fabio Mauroner (1884 – 1944) was an Italian painter  and engraver, known mainly of vedute of Venice.

Biography
He was born in Udine and moved to Venice in 1905. In Venice, Fabio shared a studio with Amedeo Modigliani, while studying printmaking with Edward M. Synge. Over the next thirty years, Mauroner executed approximately one hundred and thirty prints. 
He was a friend of Emanuele Brugnoli, another modern Venetian vedutista.

In 2011, Mauroner and Brugnoli were featured in an exhibition (The Heirs of Canaletto: Fabio Mauroner and Emanuele Brugnoli in Venice, 1905-1940) at the Italian Embassy in Washington D.C., which took place at the same time that an exhibit titled Canaletto and his rivals was being held at the National Gallery in the same city.

References

1884 births
1944 deaths
Painters from Venice
19th-century Italian painters
Italian male painters
20th-century Italian painters
Italian vedutisti
19th-century Italian male artists
20th-century Italian male artists